SimGolf is a video game created by Maxis in 1996. The game allows players to design their own golf courses and play them.

Gameplay 
The player can design their own golf course, being able to lower and raising the terrain, and can add trees, traps, lakes and other natural hazards. 

Players can play on the golf course they have designed or play the two existing courses designed by Robert Trent Jones Jr.. 

The mouseswing interface lets the player use their mouse to hit the ball, and leaves the driving, chipping and putting to the player. (The traditional "power bar" option is also available.)

Critical reception 
The game received a score of 2 out of 5 stars from Computer Games Strategy Plus.

See also 
List of golf video games
List of Maxis games

References

External links 

Demo version at Internet Archive

1996 video games
Golf video games
Maxis Sim games
Video games developed in the United States
Video games scored by Jerry Martin
Windows games
Windows-only games